In philosophy and theology, infinity is explored in articles under headings such as the Absolute, God, and Zeno's paradoxes.

In Greek philosophy, for example in Anaximander, 'the Boundless' is the origin of all that is. He took the beginning or first principle to be an endless, unlimited primordial mass (ἄπειρον, apeiron). The Jain metaphysics and mathematics were the first to define and delineate different "types" of infinities. The work of the mathematician Georg Cantor first placed infinity into a coherent mathematical framework. Keenly aware of his departure from traditional wisdom, Cantor also presented a comprehensive historical and philosophical discussion of infinity. In Christian theology, for example in the work of Duns Scotus, the infinite nature of God invokes a sense of being without constraint, rather than a sense of being unlimited in quantity.

Early thinking

Egyptian

Greek

Anaximander
An early engagement with the idea of infinity was made by Anaximander who considered infinity to be a foundational and primitive basis of reality. Anaximander was the first in the Greek philosophical tradition to propose that the universe was infinite.

Anaxagoras
Anaxagoras (500–428 BCE) was of the opinion that matter of the universe had an innate capacity for infinite division.

The Atomists
A group of thinkers of ancient Greece (later identified as the Atomists) all similarly considered matter to be made of an infinite number of structures as considered by imagining dividing or separating matter from itself an infinite number of times.

Aristotle and after
Aristotle, alive for the period 384–322 BCE, is credited with being the root of a field of thought, in his influence of succeeding thinking for a period spanning more than one subsequent millennium, by his rejection of the idea of actual infinity.

In Book 3 of the work entitled Physics, written by Aristotle, Aristotle deals with the concept of infinity in terms of his notion of actuality and of potentiality.

This is often called potential infinity; however, there are two ideas mixed up with this. One is that it is always possible to find a number of things that surpasses any given number, even if there are not actually such things. The other is that we may quantify over infinite sets without restriction. For example, which reads, "for any integer n, there exists an integer m > n such that P(m)". The second view is found in a clearer form by medieval writers such as William of Ockham:

The parts are actually there, in some sense. However, on this view, no infinite magnitude can have a number, for whatever number we can imagine, there is always a larger one: "There are not so many (in number) that there are no more."

Aristotle's views on the continuum foreshadow some topological aspects of modern mathematical theories of the continuum. Aristotle's emphasis on the connectedness of the continuum may have inspired—in different ways—modern philosophers and mathematicians such as Charles Sanders Peirce, Cantor, and LEJ Brouwer.

Among the scholastics, Aquinas also argued against the idea that infinity could be in any sense complete or a totality.

Aristotle deals with infinity in the context of the prime mover, in Book 7 of the same work, the reasoning of which was later studied and commented on by Simplicius.

Roman

Plotinus
Plotinus considered infinity, while he was alive, during the 3rd century A.D.

Simplicius
Simplicius, alive circa 490 to 560 AD, thought the concept "Mind"  was infinite.

Augustine
Augustine thought infinity to be "incomprehensible for the human mind".

Early Indian thinking
The Jain upanga āgama Surya Prajnapti (c. 400 BC) classifies all numbers into three sets: enumerable, innumerable, and infinite. Each of these was further subdivided into three orders:

 Enumerable: lowest, intermediate and highest
 Innumerable: nearly innumerable, truly innumerable and innumerably innumerable
 Infinite: nearly infinite, truly infinite, infinitely infinite

The Jains were the first to discard the idea that all infinities were the same or equal. They recognized different types of infinities: infinite in length (one dimension), infinite in area (two dimensions), infinite in volume (three dimensions), and infinite perpetually (infinite number of dimensions).

According to Singh (1987), Joseph (2000) and Agrawal (2000), the highest enumerable number N of the Jains corresponds to the modern concept of aleph-null  (the cardinal number of the infinite set of integers 1, 2, ...), the smallest cardinal transfinite number. The Jains also defined a whole system of infinite cardinal numbers, of which the highest enumerable number N is the smallest.

In the Jaina work on the theory of sets, two basic types of infinite numbers are distinguished.

Views from the Renaissance to modern times

Galileo

Galileo Galilei (February 1564 - January 1642 )   discussed the example of comparing the square numbers {1, 4, 9, 16, ...} with the natural numbers {1, 2, 3, 4, ...} as follows:
 1 → 1 2 → 4 3 → 9 4 → 16 …

It appeared by this reasoning as though a "set" (Galileo did not use the terminology) which is naturally smaller than the "set" of which it is a part (since it does not contain all the members) is in some sense the same "size". Galileo found no way around this problem:

The idea that size can be measured by one-to-one correspondence is today known as Hume's principle, although Hume, like Galileo, believed the principle could not be applied to the infinite. The same concept, applied by Georg Cantor, is used in relation to infinite sets.

Thomas Hobbes
Famously, the ultra-empiricist Hobbes ( April 1588 -  December 1679 )  tried to defend the idea of a potential infinity in light of the discovery, by Evangelista Torricelli, of a figure (Gabriel's Horn) whose surface area is infinite, but whose volume is finite.  Not reported, this motivation of Hobbes came too late as curves having infinite length yet bounding finite areas were known much before.

John Locke
Locke ( August 1632 - October 1704  ) in common with most of the empiricist philosophers, also believed that we can have no proper idea of the infinite.  They believed all our ideas were derived from sense data or "impressions," and since all sensory impressions are inherently finite, so too are our thoughts and ideas.  Our idea of infinity is merely negative or privative.

He considered that in considerations on the subject of eternity, which he classified as an infinity, humans are likely to make mistakes.

Modern philosophical views
Modern discussion of the infinite is now regarded as part of set theory and mathematics. Contemporary philosophers of mathematics engage with the topic of infinity and generally acknowledge its role in mathematical practice. But, although set theory is now widely accepted, this was not always so.  Influenced by L.E.J Brouwer and verificationism in part, Wittgenstein (April 1889  Vienna - April  1951 Cambridge, England ), made an impassioned attack upon axiomatic set theory, and upon the idea of the actual infinite, during his "middle period".

Unlike the traditional empiricists, he thought that the infinite was in some way given to sense experience.

Emmanuel Levinas
The philosopher Emmanuel Levinas ( January 1906, Lithuania -   December 25 1995, Paris     )  uses infinity to designate that which cannot be defined or reduced to knowledge or power.  In Levinas' magnum opus Totality and Infinity he says :

Levinas also wrote a work entitled Philosophy and the Idea of Infinity, which was published during 1957.

See also
Infinite monkey theorem
Philosophy of space and time

Notes

References
 D. P. Agrawal (2000). Ancient Jaina Mathematics: an Introduction, Infinity Foundation.
 L. C. Jain (1973). "Set theory in the Jaina school of mathematics", Indian Journal of History of Science.
 
 A. Newstead (2001). "Aristotle and Modern Mathematical Theories of the Continuum", in Aristotle and Contemporary Science II, D. Sfendoni-Mentzou, J. Hattiangadi, and D.M. Johnson, eds. Frankfurt: Peter Lang, 2001, 113-129, .
 A. Newstead (2009). "Cantor on Infinity in Nature, Number, and the Divine Mind", American Catholic Philosophical Quarterly, 83 (4), 533-553.
 
 Ian Pearce (2002). 'Jainism', MacTutor History of Mathematics archive.
 N. Singh (1988). 'Jaina Theory of Actual Infinity and Transfinite Numbers', Journal of Asiatic Society, Vol. 30.

External links
 Thomas Taylor  -  A Dissertation on the Philosophy of Aristotle, in Four Books. In which his principle physical and metaphysical dogmas are unfolded, and it is shown, from undubitable evidence, that his philosophy has not been accurately known since the destruction of the Greeks. The insufficiency also of the philosophy that has been substituted by the moderns for that of Aristotle, is demonstrated published by Robert Wilks, London 1812

Concepts in metaphysics
Physical cosmology